Streptomyces diastaticus is an alkaliphilic and thermophilic bacterium species from the genus of Streptomyces. Streptomyces diastaticus produces oligomycin A, oligomycin C, rimocidin and the leukotriene-A4 hydrolase-inhibitor 8(S)-amino-2(R)-methyl-7-oxononanoic acid. Streptomyces diastaticus also produces gougerotin and diastaphenazine and the antibiotic ruticin.

Further reading

See also 
 List of Streptomyces species

References

External links
Type strain of Streptomyces diastaticus at BacDive -  the Bacterial Diversity Metadatabase

diastaticus
Bacteria described in 1948